The Des Moines Capitols, were a minor league professional ice hockey team in Des Moines, Iowa, playing at the Des Moines Ice Arena. They were members of the International Hockey League from 1972 to 1975, and previously known as the Des Moines Oak Leafs. In 1973, Danny Gloor won the Gary F. Longman Memorial Trophy as rookie of the year.

In 1973–74, the Capitols won the Fred A. Huber Trophy as regular season champions, with a record of 45 wins, 25 losses, and 6 ties, totalling 96 points, despite having the most travelling of any team in the IHL. In the 1974 playoffs, the Capitols defeated the Saginaw Gears in six games to win the Turner Cup. The same season, Peter Mara was awarded the Leo P. Lamoureux Memorial Trophy, as the league's leading scorer and the James Gatschene Memorial Trophy, as outstanding playing ability and sportsmanlike conduct; and Frank Demarco won the rookie of the year.

External links
 Des Moines Capitols at the Internet Hockey Database Yearly Stats
 Des Moines Capitols at the Internet Hockey Database Cumulative Roster
 Des Moines Capitols  at AZ Hockey Database
 Des Moines Capitols Game Puck

Sports in Des Moines, Iowa
International Hockey League (1945–2001) teams
Defunct ice hockey teams in the United States
Ice hockey clubs established in 1972
Ice hockey clubs disestablished in 1975
1972 establishments in Iowa
Ice hockey teams in Iowa
1975 disestablishments in Iowa
Atlanta Flames minor league affiliates